Queen's Tower can refer to:

 Queen's Tower, Brisbane, residential skyscraper in Brisbane, Australia
 Queen's Tower (London), a building of Imperial College London
 Queen's Tower (Serpieri), a former royal estate near Athens
 Queen's Tower (Sheffield), a house in Norfolk Park
 Queen's Tower (Neduntheevu), a tower and lighthouse in Neduntheevu